Donald Paul Sloat (February 6, 1949 – January 17, 1970) was a United States Army soldier and a posthumous recipient of the Medal of Honor, the military's highest decoration for his actions in the Vietnam War.

Early life
Donald Sloat was born to Ezra Paul Sloat and his wife, Evelyn (née Turnbow) in Coweta, Oklahoma, where he lived most of his life. He graduated from Coweta High School in 1967. He then attended Northeastern Oklahoma A&M College in Miami, Oklahoma.

Military career
He enlisted in the U.S. Army on March 19, 1969. After finishing basic training at Fort Polk, Louisiana, he shipped out to South Vietnam in September, 1969. By then, he was a machine gunner in the 3rd Platoon, Company D, 2nd Battalion, 1st Infantry Regiment, 196th Light Infantry Brigade, 23rd Infantry Division (Americal Division).

Awards and decorations
Sloat earned the following awards and decorations:

From 2002, the U.S. Army reviewed all 6,500 recipients of the Distinguished Service Cross to see if any recipients had been short-changed; this led to two dozen medal upgrades in March 2014. In 2013, as part of the National Defense Authorization Act for Fiscal Year 2014, the Senate Armed Service Committee passed a provision removing the time limit for Donald P. Sloat and Bennie G. Adkins. On September 15, 2014, President Obama awarded the Medal of Honor to Adkins as an upgrade of his 1967 Distinguished Service Cross. During that ceremony, the Medal of Honor was awarded posthumously to Sloat and American Civil War army officer Alonzo Cushing. President Barack Obama presented the medal to Donald's brother, Bill Sloat (now deceased), in a ceremony at the East Room of the White House.

Medal of Honor citation 
Rank and organization: Specialist Four, United States Army, 3rd Platoon, Delta Company, 2nd Battalion, 1st Infantry Regiment, 196th Light Infantry Brigade, Americal Division.

Place and date:  Que Son Valley, Quảng Nam Province, Republic of Vietnam, January 17, 1970

Entered service at: Coweta, Oklahoma

Citation

Decorations donated to Coweta
February 6, 2017, was declared as Specialist Donald P. Sloat Medal of Honor Day in Coweta. The remainder of Sloat's family had decided to donate the Medal of Honor, along with many other military decorations, to Robert Morton, mayor of the city of Coweta, for display. The medals will be permanently displayed at Coweta City Hall.

References

1949 births
1970 deaths
American military personnel killed in the Vietnam War
United States Army Medal of Honor recipients
Recipients of the Gallantry Cross (Vietnam)
United States Army soldiers
Vietnam War recipients of the Medal of Honor
People from Coweta, Oklahoma
Deaths by hand grenade
United States Army personnel of the Vietnam War